In Greek mythology, Ctimenus (Ancient Greek: Κτιμένου), from Dolopian Ctimene in Thessaly, was the father of the Argonaut Eurydamas. Otherwise, the latter was the son of Irus and Demonassa.

Notes

References 

 Apollonius Rhodius, Argonautica translated by Robert Cooper Seaton (1853-1915), R. C. Loeb Classical Library Volume 001. London, William Heinemann Ltd, 1912. Online version at the Topos Text Project.
 Apollonius Rhodius, Argonautica. George W. Mooney. London. Longmans, Green. 1912. Greek text available at the Perseus Digital Library.
 Gaius Julius Hyginus, Fabulae from The Myths of Hyginus translated and edited by Mary Grant. University of Kansas Publications in Humanistic Studies. Online version at the Topos Text Project.

Thessalian characters in Greek mythology